FLIT is the brand name for an insecticide. The original product, invented by chemist Dr. Franklin C. Nelson and launched in 1923 and mainly intended for killing flies and mosquitoes, was mineral oil based and manufactured by the Standard Oil Company of New Jersey before the company, now part of ExxonMobil, was renamed first Esso and later Exxon. The Esso formulation contained 5% DDT in the late 1940s and early 1950s, before the negative environmental impact of DDT was widely understood. Later marketed as "FLIT MLO", it has since been discontinued. A hand-operated atomizer called a Flit gun was commonly used to perform the spraying.

The Flit brand name has been reused for another insecticide product, with the primary active ingredient of permethrin, marketed by Clarke Mosquito Control. The current product is most often used to control adult mosquitoes. Spraying it into the air kills adult mosquitoes that are present and then by settling onto surfaces it kills mosquitoes that may later land.

"Quick, Henry, the Flit!"

In 1928, Flit, then marketed by a newly formed subsidiary of Jersey Standard, Stanco Incorporated, became the subject of a very successful long running advertising campaign. Theodor Seuss Geisel created the artwork for this campaign, years before he started writing the children's books that made him famous as Dr. Seuss. The ads typically showed people threatened by whimsical, menacing insect-like creatures that would look familiar to fans of Dr. Seuss's later work and contained the tagline "Quick, Henry, the Flit!"

Seuss's artwork associated with Flit included numerous racial caricatures which, although not unusual for the 1930s, are now seen as racially insensitive. 

This advertising campaign continued for 17 years and made "Quick, Henry, the Flit!" a popular catchphrase in the United States.

U-2 fuel 
According to Ben Rich (a junior propulsion engineer on the U2 program), some raw material (possibly the solvent) used for the production of FLIT was similar to that used for LF-1A fuel for the Lockheed U-2 high altitude reconnaissance aircraft, causing a nationwide shortage of bug spray in 1955. The fuel LF-1A was produced by Shell Oil Company.

References

Insecticide brands
Works by Dr. Seuss
Phrases